Shimagawa Dam is a dam in the Gunma Prefecture of Japan.

Dams in Gunma Prefecture
Dams completed in 1999
1999 establishments in Japan